Iosif Magöry (born 1904, date of death unknown) was a Romanian footballer who played as a defender.

International career
Iosif Magöry played one friendly match for Romania, on 19 June 1927 under coach Teofil Morariu in a 3–3 against Poland.

References

External links
 

1904 births
Year of death missing
Romanian footballers
Romania international footballers
Place of birth missing
Association football defenders
Liga I players